The Jinhua Stadium is a sports venue in Zhejiang, PR China. It has a capacity of 30,000 and it is used mostly for football matches. It is also used for athletics.

References

Football venues in China
Multi-purpose stadiums in China